Artsiom Alyaksandravich Machekin (born 20 January 1991) is a Belarusian swimmer. He competed in the men's 50 metre freestyle event at the 2018 FINA World Swimming Championships (25 m), in Hangzhou, China. In 2019, he competed in three events at the 2019 World Aquatics Championships held in Gwangju, South Korea.

References

External links
 

1991 births
Living people
Sportspeople from Daugavpils
Belarusian male freestyle swimmers
Place of birth missing (living people)
Swimmers at the 2020 Summer Olympics
Olympic swimmers of Belarus